This Bud's for You... is an album by saxophonist Bud Shank which was released on the Muse label.

Reception

Scott Yanow, writing for AllMusic, stated: "Bud Shank's playing from this recording forward surprised many listeners. There was a forcefulness and a passion to his alto solos (he had given up the flute) that had not been heard that much from him previously".

Track listing 
 "I'll Be Seeing You" (Sammy Fain, Irving Kahal) - 4:57
 "Nica's Dream" (Horace Silver) - 5:04
 "Never Never Land" (Betty Comden, Adolph Green, Jule Styne) - 5:38
 "Spacemaker" (Walter Norris) - 3:30
 "Visa" (Charlie Parker) - 5:28
 "Cotton Blossom" (Bud Shank) - 4:44
 "Bouncing with Bud" (Bud Powell) - 4:10

Personnel 
 Bud Shank - alto saxophone
 Kenny Barron - piano
 Ron Carter - bass
 Al Foster - drums

References 

1985 albums
Bud Shank albums
Muse Records albums